Hammerschmidtia rufa (Fallén, 1817), the black-bristled logsitter, is an uncommon species of syrphid fly observed across North America. Hoverflies can remain nearly motionless in flight. The adults are also known as flower flies for they are commonly found on flowers from which they get both energy-giving nectar and protein-rich pollen. Larvae have been found under bark of aspen, elm, walnut, and willow. Described as Hammerschmidtia ferruginea by Curran.

References

Eristalinae
Insects described in 1817
Taxa named by Carl Fredrik Fallén
Diptera of North America